A trilby is a  narrow-brimmed type of hat. The trilby was once viewed as the rich man's favored hat; it is sometimes called the "brown trilby" in Britain and was frequently seen at the horse races. 

The traditional London hat company Lock and Co. describes the trilby as having a "shorter brim which is angled down at the front and slightly turned up at the back" compared to the fedora's "wider brim which is more level". The trilby also has a slightly shorter crown than a typical fedora design.

History
The hat's name derives from the stage adaptation of George du Maurier's 1894 novel Trilby. A hat of this style was worn in the first London production of the play, and promptly came to be called "a Trilby hat".  
Its shape somewhat resembles the Tyrolean hat.

 Traditionally it was made from rabbit hair felt, but now is usually made from other materials, such as tweed, straw, heavyweight cotton, wool and wool/nylon blends. The hat reached its zenith of common popularity in the 1960s; the lower head clearance in American automobiles made it impractical to wear a hat with a tall crown while driving. It faded from popularity in the 1970s when men's headwear went out of fashion and men's fashion focused on highly maintained hairstyles instead.

The hat saw a resurgence in popularity in the early 1980s, when it was marketed to both men and women in an attempt to capitalise on a retro fashion trend.

In popular culture
Frank Sinatra was identified with trilby hats, and there is a signature design trilby bearing his name. The reggae poet  Linton Kwesi Johnson often wears a trilby during his performances. Peter Sellers as Inspector Clouseau wore a Herbert Johnson trilby in Blake Edwards's A Shot in the Dark (1964), the second of his  Pink Panther series; the felt trilby gave way to a tweed one in later films. The cartoon character Inspector Gadget wears a trilby hat.

In the Series One episode “The Think Tank” of the program Are You Being Served?, the Grace Brothers store policy is revealed to include a hierarchical order for hats male personnel wear:  bowlers for departmental heads and above, homburgs for senior floor staff and trilbys or caps for junior floor staff.

See also
 Fedora
 Homburg
 Pork pie hat
 Gat (hat)
 Shako, a tall, cylindrical military cap
 List of headgear
 Cap

References

External links

 History of Felt hats & Straw hats - Felt dress hats

1910s fashion
1920s fashion
1930s fashion
1940s fashion
1950s fashion
1960s fashion
1970s fashion
1980s fashion
1990s fashion
2000s fashion
2010s fashion
2020s fashion
Hats
Trilby (novel)